Isaac P. Witter (May 11, 1873 – September 26, 1942) was a member of the Wisconsin State Senate.

Biography
Witter was born on May 11, 1873 in Wisconsin Rapids, Wisconsin. He attended the University of Wisconsin–Madison and married Charlotte L. Gibson, the daughter of an Episcopal clergyman, in 1900. They had one son. Witter was a member of the Benevolent and Protective Order of Elks. Witter went to University of Wisconsin and worked at the Bank of Grand Rapids, which he became president of. Witter was also involved with the Consolidated Water & Power Company. Witter died in Wisconsin Rapids, Wisconsin on September 26, 1942.

Political career
Witter was a member of the Senate during the 1917 and 1919 sessions. Additionally, he was a school board member. He was a Republican.

References

External links
The Political Graveyard

People from Wisconsin Rapids, Wisconsin
Businesspeople from Wisconsin
School board members in Wisconsin
Republican Party Wisconsin state senators
University of Wisconsin–Madison alumni
American bank presidents
1873 births
1942 deaths